Brandon Disair Díaz Ramírez (born March 24, 1992) is a Mexican freestyle wrestler.

Career 
Díaz started wrestling when he was 10 years old and has been active in competition since 2006 under the coaching of Manuel Viramontes. He has competed at multiple world-class level tournaments such as the World Championships, the Central American and Caribbean Games, the Pan American Games, the Pan American Championships and numerous Grands Prix, medaling at some of them.

Major results

References

External links 
 

Living people
1993 births
Mexican male sport wrestlers
Wrestlers at the 2019 Pan American Games
Central American and Caribbean Games medalists in wrestling
Central American and Caribbean Games bronze medalists for Mexico
Competitors at the 2014 Central American and Caribbean Games
Pan American Games competitors for Mexico
Pan American Wrestling Championships medalists
20th-century Mexican people
21st-century Mexican people